The 2011–12 season was the Tractor Sazi Football Club's 4th season in the Iran Pro League, their 3rd consecutive season in the top division of Iranian football, and their 41st year in existence as a football club. They also competed in the Hazfi Cup, where they were eliminated in the Round of 32 by Shahrdari Yasuj.

Players

First-team squad
As of 31 January 2012.

Iran Pro League squad
.

For recent transfers, see List of Iranian football transfers winter 2011–12.

Transfers 
Confirmed transfers 2011–12

Summer 

In:

Out:

, Loan Return

Winter 

In:

Out:

Competitions

Iran Pro League

Standings

Results summary

Results by round

Matches

Hazfi Cup

Matches

Round of 32

Friendly Matches

Statistics

Appearances 

|}

Top scorers
Includes all competitive matches. The list is sorted by shirt number when total goals are equal.

Last updated on 22 February 2011

Friendlies and Pre season goals are not recognized as competitive match goals.

Top assistors
Includes all competitive matches. The list is sorted by shirt number when total assistors are equal.

Last updated on 22 February 2011

Friendlies and Pre season goals are not recognized as competitive match assist.

Disciplinary record
Includes all competitive matches. Players with 1 card or more included only.

Last updated on 22 February 2011

Goals conceded 
 Updated on 21 May 2011

Matches played 
 Updated on 2 April 2011

Own goals 
 Updated on 2 April 2011

Club

Kit 

|
|

Coaching staff

Other information

See also
 2011–12 Persian Gulf Cup
 2011–12 Hazfi Cup

References

External links
 Iran Premier League Statistics
 Persian League

Tractor S.C. seasons
Iranian football clubs 2011–12 season